Megandrena is a genus of mining bees in the family Andrenidae. There are at least two described species in Megandrena.

Species
These two species belong to the genus Megandrena:
 Megandrena enceliae (Cockerell, 1927) (encelia megandrena)
 Megandrena mentzeliae Zavortink, 1972

References

Further reading

 
 

Andreninae
Articles created by Qbugbot